The Barnoldswick Railway was an English railway company, that constructed a short branch line to Barnoldswick from a junction on the Midland Railway line from Skipton to Colne. It was opened in 1871, and was worked from the outset by the Midland Railway. It was moderately successful in financial terms, and the company was acquired by the Midland Railway in 1899.

Declining usage led to the line being closed to passengers in 1965 and to goods in 1966.

Construction and opening

Barnoldswick was a small cotton weaving community. Local industry was hampered by poor transport links, although this was mitigated by the opening of a local part of the Leeds and Liverpool Canal in the last decade of the eighteenth century.

The Midland Railway line from Skipton to Colne opened in 1848, by-passing Barnoldswick, and this emphasised the disadvantage, giving a boost to communities on the line of route.

Commitment was raised locally to build a line from the town to make a junction with the Midland Railway at Sough Bridge, near Earby. An authorising Act of Parliament for the Barnoldswick Railway Company was obtained on 12 August 1867 (30 & 31 Vict., clxxxi).

The line was worked by the Midland Railway from its opening on 13 February 1871. by the Midland Railway.

Train service
In 1895 there were nine trains each way between Barnoldswick and Earby, with four each way on Sundays. By 1910 the service had increased to between 15 and 18 on weekdays, varying by day of the week, and six on Sundays. In 1922 the weekday service was similar, but the Sunday service had fallen to two trains each way. In 1938 there were 26 trains Monday to Friday, with 28 on Saturdays and nine on Sundays.

Absorbed by the Midland Railway
In March 1898, the Barnoldswick company asked the Midland Railway if it would purchase the line. As it was trouble-free and regularly paid out a reasonable if fluctuating dividend — on June 30, 1897, it was 5 per cent — the Midland agreed and the necessary powers were obtained in 1899. The Midland Railway absorbed the company by Act of 13 July 1899. It was the last company to be acquired by the Midland Railway.

Light railway proposed
In May, 1904, the Barnoldswick and Gisburn Light Railway sought powers to make a short single track line leaving the Lancashire and Yorkshire Railway just north of Gisburn station and connecting with the Barnoldswick branch. It was scotched by the L&YR's refusal to allow a junction at Gisburn. 

Baughan explains:
Actually, the L&YR pulled a fast one over the engineer to the line, E O Ferguson, by appearing to agree to all the clauses and then turning up at the inquiry, held by two of the Light Railway Commissioners in the 'Ribblesdale Arms' at Gisburn, and denying that it would permit the junction. The company had, it appeared, been too busy to look at the scheme properly. Shattered by this bland effrontery, the promoters withdrew the scheme. Nine years later, presumably having had enough time to reason out where they had gone wrong, the idea was again put forward, on a slightly amended route, and without the junction to the Midland. This time the L&YR was all smiles, provided it was permitted to work the line. 

The Order was granted but World War I prevented any actual construction.

Heating in the trains
On 16 November 1922 the Midland Railway traffic committee authorised the fitting of steam heating apparatus in the nine carriages and two engines working the Barnoldswick branch service, nearly twenty years after the main line coaches had been so fitted and barely a month before the Midland Railway ceased to exist, due to the Grouping of 1923.

Closure
Declining use led to the closure of the branch, to passengers on 27 September 1965 and to goods on 1 August 1966.

Location list
 Barnoldswick Junction;
 Barnoldswick; opened 13 February 1871; closed 27 September 1965.

See also 
 Barnoldswick railway station
 Earby railway station

Notes

References

Early British railway companies
Midland Railway
Transport in the Borough of Pendle
Railway companies established in 1862
Railway lines opened in 1871
Railway companies disestablished in 1899
Barnoldswick
1862 establishments in England
1899 disestablishments in England
British companies disestablished in 1899
British companies established in 1862